Sisters Who Make Waves (Season 3) (Chinese: 乘风破浪3; pinyin: Chéngfēngpòlàng 3) is the third season of Sisters Who Make Waves which premiered on May 20, 2022, on Mango TV. This season featured 30 celebrities aged over 30 who compete to form a girl group. The winner of season one, Ning Jing, and the winner of season two, Na Ying, returned to the show as team captains to lead and perform alongside the 30 contestants.

Concept 
Following the success of the first and second seasons, Mango TV presented the third season of the show just over a year after the end of season 2. The general concept of the show remains the same as the previous seasons. However, slight changes were made to the competition and performance formats.

Contestants 
Each contestant's English name will be used if known. Otherwise, the pinyin version of the name would be used in the order of surname followed by given name. All names in parenthesis are in simplified Chinese. All ages and years are at the time of the competition.

Episodes

Episode 1 (May 20, 2022) 
In the first episode, each of the 30 contestants self selected between wanting become a group leader (group leader contestant) and wanting to become a group member (group member contestant). All contestants and the two team captains performed a personal preliminary stage. The preliminary stage performances took place in two rounds, starting with the group leader contestants followed by the group member contestants.

In Round 1, the group leader contestants decided between themselves the order of performance. After each group leader contestant's performance, each group member contestant and the two team captains could raise their hands to vote for the performer to become a group leader. However, each contestant can only vote for one person. The three performers in Round 1 with the most votes became group leaders for the first public performance.

In Round 2, the group member contestants decided between themselves the order of performance. After all performances were complete, each group member contestant and the two team captains wrote down the names of three contestants who they would like to see as group captains. The three performers in Round 2 with the most votes became group leaders for the first public performance.

After the six group leaders have been decided, team captains must pair with three group leaders each to form their team. First, the two team captains were paired with one group leader each. To do this, each team captain wrote down the name of one group leader who they would want to have on their team, and each group leader wrote down the name of one team captain who they would like to work with. If the names on the team captain and group leader's card corresponds with each other, the pairing is a success. For the rest of the group leaders, the team captains and group leaders discussed between themselves how to split into the two teams.

Results 
Displayed in order of performance.

Group Leader and Team Captain Pairings

For the first round of pairings, Aya Liu joined team Ning Jing and Sitar Tan joined team Natasha Na. During the discussion round, Kelsey Zhao and Kelly Yu joined team Ning Jing and Liu Lian and Momo Wu joined team Natasha Na.

Impact

Cyndi Wang's performance of her classic song "Love You" during the first stage instantly became popular throughout China, setting off a wave of memories from mostly middle aged men who listened to the original version of the song when they were young. Following the airing of the first episode, netizens began uploading covers of the performance and led to the "Cyndi Boy" craze. Cyndi's sudden popularity from the show led many of her songs to make top charts in many Chinese music streaming services.

References 

2022 Chinese television seasons